Kalica is a small village in the municipality of Petnjica, Montenegro.

Demographics
According to the 2011 census, its population was 128.

References

Populated places in Petnjica Municipality